Saint Arcadius (died 549 AD) was a bishop of Bourges.  He took part in the Third Council of Orléans (538).  He was bishop for about 15 years.  His episcopate is sometimes said to have lasted from 531 to 541.

Notes

External links
Arcadius of Bourges

Bishops of Bourges
6th-century Frankish bishops
549 deaths
6th-century Frankish saints
Year of birth unknown